Athletics events were contested at the 1985 Summer Universiade in Kobe, Japan between 29 August and 4 September. New events were women's 10,000 metres and 5000 metres walk.

Medals summary

Men's events

Women's events

Medal table

See also
 1985 in athletics (track and field)

References
World Student Games (Universiade – Men) – GBR Athletics
World Student Games (Universiade – Women) – GBR Athletics

Athletics at the Summer Universiade
Uni
1985 Summer Universiade
International athletics competitions hosted by Japan